Blastobasis walsinghami is a moth in the family Blastobasidae. It is found on Madeira.

References

Moths described in 2004
Blastobasis